Fernando Paggi (3 July 1914 – 14 January 1973) was a Swiss conductor and musician known for conducting the Swiss entries for three Eurovision Song Contests. He was also the conductor of the Radio Monte Ceneri Orchestra.

Competitions

 Eurovision Song Contest 1956 – conducted the winning entry for host nation Switzerland, Refrain, sung by Lys Assia; also conducted the Dutch and German entries
 Eurovision Song Contest 1961
 Eurovision Song Contest 1964

References

1914 births
1973 deaths
Eurovision Song Contest conductors
Swiss conductors (music)
Male conductors (music)
20th-century conductors (music)
20th-century male musicians